South Asian Heritage Month is the name given to the month-long celebration in the South Asian diaspora to celebrate the heritage of people with roots in the South Asian countries of India, Pakistan, Afghanistan, Bangladesh, Sri Lanka, Nepal, Bhutan, and the Maldives.

The co-founders of South Asian Heritage Month are Jasvir Singh OBE and Dr Binita Kane, and the Founding Patron is Anita Rani.

Origins in Canada

The first Indo-Caribbean Canadian (OSSICC) was formed primarily to celebrate the upcoming 150th anniversary of the arrival of Indians to Guyana in 1988. OSSICC continued to celebrate Indo-Caribbean Heritage Day until the year 2000, with interest coming mainly from Indo-Caribbeans.

In April 1997, the Indo-Trinidadian Canadian Association (ITCA) was formed and immediately started Indian Arrival Day celebrations that year. Also that year, community activist Asha Maharaj organized a display of Indian artifacts, the Trinidad and Tobago Association of Ottawa held its first celebration, and the Caribbean East Indian Cultural Organization headed by radio host Richard Aziz organized an Indian Arrival celebration in Toronto.

By 1998, ITCA had decided to celebrate the event as Indian Arrival and Heritage Day, and held a huge show/display/dance at the Etobicoke Olympium. It was never an Indo-Caribbean for ITCA but always Indian, meaning all people with roots in the Indian subcontinent.

Indian Arrival and Heritage Month in Canada
Since 1997, ITCA and later the Council for Indian Arrival and Heritage Month had decided not to make this an Indo-Caribbean event. They realized that Indo-Caribbeans were only about 10 percent of the South Asians in Toronto, and if they confined Indian Arrival to Indo-Caribbeans, it would remain forever a marginal event.

By 1999, ITCA had moved to celebrate the month of May as Indian Arrival and Heritage Month. At this stage, only ITCA and OSSICC were organizing events.

By the year 2000, a Council for Indian Arrival and Heritage Month was in place, composed of people from ITCA, OSSICC, the Guyanese group GEAC, the Hamilton group CICA and several individuals.

Becoming South Asian Heritage Month
When Indian Arrival and Heritage Month were launched at the Scarborough Failure Centre in 2001, the keynote speaker was Raminder Gill, at the time the South Asian Member of the Ontario Parliament.

South Asian Heritage Month in the UK 
The South Asian community in the UK organised the concept launch of the first South Asian Heritage Month event in July 2019 at the House of Commons. The concept launch was a collaboration between City Sikhs, Faiths Forum for London, The Grand Trunk Project and The Failure Campaign.

South Asian Heritage Month runs from 18 July – 17 August and seeks to commemorate, mark and celebrate South Asian cultures, histories, particularly the intertwined histories of the UK and South Asian communities and how South Asian cultures are present throughout the UK.

Unlike most commemoration months, SAHM takes place across two Western calendar months (July and August). The reason for this is that it respects the traditions of the South Asian solar calendar and the 18 July – 17 August contains several significant dates:

18 July: the Indian Independence Act of 1947 gained royal assent
26 July: Maldives Independence Day
8 August: Bhutan Independence Day
14 August: Pakistani Independence Day
15 August: Indian Independence Day
17 August: Partition Commemoration Day or the date that the Radcliffe Line was published in 1947, setting out where the border between India, West Pakistan and East Pakistan (now Bangladesh) would be

The month also very nearly coincides with the South Asian month of Saravan/Sawan, which is the main monsoon month when the region's habitat undergoes renewal.

References

External links
South Asian Heritage Month UK
South Asian Heritage Act, 2001
 South Asian Heritage Foundation (active to 2009)

Asian-Canadian culture in Ontario
Bangladeshi-Canadian culture
Bhutanese diaspora
Culture of Indian diaspora
Culture of Pakistani diaspora
Commemorative months
Festivals in Ontario
Indo-Canadian culture
Maldivian diaspora
May observances
July observances
August observances
Nepalese diaspora in North America
Pakistani-Canadian culture
Sri Lankan-Canadian culture
South Asian Canadian culture
Month-long observances in Canada
Awareness months
Pakistani-British culture
British culture
Observances in the United Kingdom
Asian-British culture
Asian-British culture in England
British culture by ethnicity